There have been three baronetcies created for persons with the surname Baillie, one in the Baronetage of Nova Scotia and two in the Baronetage of the United Kingdom. As of 2014 one creation is extant.

The Baillie Baronetcy, of Lochend in the County of Haddington, was created in the Baronetage of Nova Scotia on 21 November 1636 for the 20-year-old Gideon Baillie. He was the son of Sir James Baillie, Receiver of the Crown of Scotland. The title became dormant on the death of the first Baronet's son, the second Baronet, in circa 1648.

The Baillie, later Mackenzie Baronetcy, of Portman Square in the County of London, was created in the Baronetage of the United Kingdom on 11 December 1812 for Ewen Baillie. He obtained a new patent on 26 May 1819. For more information on these creations, see Mackenzie baronets.

The Baillie Baronetcy,  in the County of Linlithgow, was created in the baronetage of the United Kingdom on 14 November 1823 for William Baillie. He was the son of William Baillie, Lord Polkemmet, a Lord of Session. The first baronet was succeeded by his eldest son, the second baronet. He sat as Conservative Member of Parliament for Linlithgowshire. He was childless and was succeeded by his nephew, the third baronet. He emigrated to Australia and was a justice of the peace for New South Wales and Victoria. He died unmarried at an early age and was succeeded by his younger brother, the fourth baronet. His second son, the sixth baronet (who succeeded his elder brother who was killed in the First World War), was conservative member of parliament for Linlithgowshire and Tonbridge. His wife was Olive, Lady Baillie. As of 2010 the title is held by the latter's grandson, the eighth baronet, who succeeded his father in 2003.

The family seat was Polkemmet House near Whitburn, West Lothian.

Baillie baronets, of Lochend (1636) 
Sir Gideon Baillie, 1st Baronet (1616–1640)
Sir James Baillie, 2nd Baronet (d.  c. 1648)

Baillie baronets, of Portman Square (1812) and of Berkeley Square (1819) 

See Mackenzie baronets

Baillie baronets, of Polkemmet (1819) 
Sir William Baillie, 1st Baronet (1784–1854)
Sir William Baillie, 2nd Baronet (1816–1890)
Sir George Baillie, 3rd Baronet (1856–1896)
Sir Robert Alexander Baillie, 4th Baronet (1859–1907)
Sir Gawaine George Stuart Baillie, 5th Baronet (1893–1914)
Sir Adrian William Maxwell Baillie, 6th Baronet (1898–1947)
Sir Gawaine George Hope Baillie, 7th Baronet (1934–2003)
Sir Adrian Louis Baillie, 8th Baronet (b. 1973)

Notes

References
Kidd, Charles, Williamson, David (editors). Debrett's Peerage and Baronetage (1990 edition). New York: St Martin's Press, 1990, 

Baronetcies in the Baronetage of the United Kingdom
Extinct baronetcies in the Baronetage of Nova Scotia
Extinct baronetcies in the Baronetage of the United Kingdom